Brongniart is the surname of a notable French family:

 Antoine-Louis Brongniart (1742–1804), chemist, younger brother of
 Alexandre-Théodore Brongniart (1739–1813), architect who gave his name to the Palais Brongniart, the former seat of the Paris Bourse, father of
 Alexandre Brongniart (1770–1847), mineralogist and naturalist, father of
 Adolphe-Théodore Brongniart (1801–76), botanist, father of
 Édouard-Charles Brongniart, painter and schools inspector, father of
 Charles Jules Edmée Brongniart (1859–1899), zoologist

See also
 Brongniartia (disambiguation)
 Brongniartieae